The Explorer is the second studio album by Swedish singer-songwriter E-Type which was released on 25 October 1996. It contains hit songs "Calling Your Name", "Back in the Loop" and "I Just Wanna Be with You". "Calling Your Name" peaked number 17 on the US Billboard Dance Club Songs Chart.

Track listing

 Intro - The explorer
 Calling your name
 Back in the loop
 I just wanna be with you
 Free like a flying demon
 You know
 Forever wild
 Fall from the sky
 I'm not alone
 We gotta go
 You will always be a part of me
 So dem a com (Explorer version)

Chart

References

1996 albums
E-Type (musician) albums
Albums produced by Max Martin
Albums recorded at Cheiron Studios